Chatteris Town Football Club is a football club based in Chatteris, Cambridgeshire, England.
Dear Chatteris Town FC,
Sadly yesterday Thursday 16th March 2023 one of your star footballers Kenny Stocker passed away age 78 years old.
He was part of the successful team in the 60’s including Johnny Bailey, Roger Pearl, Maurice Smith,
Keith Fayers, Alan Cox, etc etc.
Yesterday I had the privilege to look through all his cuttings he’d kept for over 50 years.
Kenny Smith

History
The club was founded in 1920 as Chatteris Town Juniors, before adopting their current name in 1921. They joined the Isle of Ely League, and after a fast rise through the divisions, they won the league title in 1922–23. In 1924 they joined Division Two of the Cambridgeshire League, and were promoted to Division One at the end of the season as the division was enlarged. In 1928–29 they won Division 1B, but lost a play-off against the Division 1A champions. In 1931–32 they won the Cambridgeshire League and transferred to the Peterborough & District League. In December 1935 financial problems caused them to withdraw from the league. In 1936 they reformed as a junior team, and joined Division 1B of the Cambridgeshire League, winning it at the first attempt.

They also rejoined the Peterborough & District league. They won the league in 1963–64, winning 30 of their 32 matches. The following season they won the title again, this time winning 29 of their 30 matches. A hat-trick of titles was completed in 1965–66, in which they won 27 out of 30 matches. At the end of the season they joined the Eastern Counties League in 1966, and won the League Cup in 1968. The club set its record attendance of 2,000 in a match against local rivals March Town United at the end of the 1988-89 season, a game which March Town United needed to win to clinch the ECL title (and did following a 5–0 win).

When the league added a second tier in 1988, Chatteris were placed in the Premier Division following a 7th-place finish the previous season. The club struggled in the new division, finishing bottom in 1989–90 (a season in which they failed to win a league game) and 1990–91, but were reprieved from relegation as the league lost members who were promoted to the Southern League and Division One clubs failed to meet ground grading criteria. However, the club were eventually relegated in 1995 after finishing bottom and winning just two league games all season.

They continued to play in Division One until 2001, when, despite finishing fifth, they resigned from the league for financial reasons and dropped back into the Peterborough & District League. In 2008 they transferred to Senior Division B the Cambridgeshire League, finishing third in their first season and earning promotion. The following season saw them win the Senior A Division to earn promotion to the Premier Division. They were relegated back to the Senior A Division at the end of the 2012–13 season. In 2015–16 season Chatteris finished second in the division, earning promotion back to the Premier Division; they also won three cups, beating Great Shelford 2–1 to win the Cliff Bullen Challenge Cup, Outwell Swifts 1–0 in the William Coad Intermediate Cup and Milton 3–0 to win the William Cockell Memorial Cup.

Ground
The club played at several grounds following its establishment, including New Road, Blackhorse Lane, St Martins Road, Chatteris Park and Chatteris Recreation Ground. In 1932 they moved to West Street, which was used by West Ham United as their base whilst away from London during World War II.

Honours
Eastern Counties League
League Cup winners 1967–68
Cambridgeshire League
Champions 1931–32
Senior A Division champions 2009–10
Division 1B champions 1928–29, 1936–37
William Coad Intermediate Cup winners 2015–16
William Cockell Memorial Cup winners 2015–16
Peterborough & District League
Champions 1963–64, 1964–65, 1965–66
Isle of Ely League
Champions 1922–23
Cambridgeshire Challenge Cup
Winners 1951–52, 1954–55, 1962–63, 1963–64, 1964–65, 2015–16

Records
Record attendance: 2,000 vs March Town United, Eastern Counties League, 12 May 1988

References

External links
Club website

Football clubs in England
Football clubs in Cambridgeshire
Association football clubs established in 1920
1920 establishments in England
Peterborough and District Football League
Eastern Counties Football League
Cambridgeshire County Football League
Chatteris